Ai Weiwei (born 28 August 1957) is a Chinese contemporary artist, documentarian, and activist. Ai grew up in the far northwest of China, where he lived under harsh conditions due to his father's exile. As an activist, he has been openly critical of the Chinese Government's stance on democracy and human rights. He investigated government corruption and cover-ups, in particular the Sichuan schools corruption scandal following the collapse of "tofu-dreg schools" in the 2008 Sichuan earthquake. In 2011, Ai Weiwei was arrested at Beijing Capital International Airport on 3 April, for "economic crimes". He was detained for 81 days without charge. Ai Weiwei emerged as a vital instigator in Chinese cultural development, an architect of Chinese modernism, and one of the nation's most vocal political commentators.

Ai Weiwei encapsulates political conviction and his personal poetry in his many sculptures, photographs, and public works. In doing this, he makes use of Chinese art forms to display Chinese political and social issues.

After being allowed to leave China in 2015, he has lived in Berlin, Germany, in Cambridge, UK, with his family, and in Portugal.

Life

Early life and work
Ai's father was the Chinese poet Ai Qing, who was denounced during the Anti-Rightist Movement. In 1958, the family was sent to a labour camp in Beidahuang, Heilongjiang, when Ai was one year old. They were subsequently exiled to Shihezi, Xinjiang in 1961, where they lived for 16 years. Upon Mao Zedong's death and the end of the Cultural Revolution, the family returned to Beijing in 1976.

In 1978, Ai enrolled in the Beijing Film Academy and studied animation. In 1978, he was one of the founders of the early avant garde art group the "Stars", together with Ma Desheng, Wang Keping, Mao Lizi, Huang Rui, Li Shuang, Ah Cheng and Qu Leilei. The group disbanded in 1983, yet Ai participated in regular Stars group shows, The Stars: Ten Years, 1989 (Hanart Gallery, Hong Kong and Taipei), and a retrospective exhibition in Beijing in 2007: Origin Point (Today Art Museum, Beijing).

Life in the United States

From 1981 to 1993, he lived in the United States. He was among the first generation of students to study abroad following China's reform in 1980, being one of the 161 students to take the TOEFL (Test of English as a Foreign Language) in 1981. For the first few years, Ai lived in Philadelphia and San Francisco. He studied English at the University of Pennsylvania and the University of California, Berkeley. Later, he moved to New York City. He studied briefly at Parsons School of Design. Ai attended the Art Students League of New York from 1983 to 1986, where he studied with Bruce Dorfman, Knox Martin and Richard Pousette-Dart. He later dropped out of school and made a living out of drawing street portraits and working odd jobs. During this period, he gained exposure to the works of Marcel Duchamp, Andy Warhol, and Jasper Johns, and began creating conceptual art by altering readymade objects.

Ai befriended beat poet Allen Ginsberg while living in New York, following a chance meeting at a poetry reading where Ginsberg read out several poems about China. Ginsberg had traveled to China and met with Ai's father, the noted poet Ai Qing, and consequently Ginsberg and Ai became friends.

When he was living in the East Village (from 1983 to 1993), Ai carried a camera with him all the time and would take pictures of his surroundings wherever he was. The resulting collection of photos were later selected and is now known as the New York Photographs. At the same time, Ai became fascinated by blackjack card games and frequented Atlantic City casinos. He is still regarded in gambling circles as a top tier professional blackjack player according to an article published on blackjackchamp.com.

Return to China
In 1993, Ai returned to China after his father became ill. He helped establish the experimental artists' Beijing East Village and co-published a series of three books about this new generation of artists with Chinese curator Feng Boyi: Black Cover Book (1994), White Cover Book (1995), and Gray Cover Book (1997).

In 1999, Ai moved to Caochangdi, in the northeast of Beijing, and built a studio house – his first architectural project. Due to his interest in architecture, he founded the architecture studio FAKE Design, in 2003. In 2000, he co-curated the art exhibition Fuck Off with curator Feng Boyi in Shanghai, China.

Life in Europe
In 2011, Ai was arrested in China on charges of tax evasion, jailed for 81 days, and then released. The government had kept his passport confiscated and refused him any other travel papers. Following the return of his passport in 2015, Ai moved to Berlin where he maintained a large studio in a former brewery. He lived in the studio and used it as the base for his international work.
In 2019, he announced he would be leaving Berlin, saying that Germany is not an open culture. In September 2019, he moved to live in Cambridge, England.

As of 2021, Ai lives in Montemor-o-Novo, Portugal. He still maintains a base in Cambridge, where his son attends school, and a studio in Berlin. Ai says he will stay in Portugal long-term "unless something happens".

Ai sits on the Board of Advisors for the Committee for Freedom in Hong Kong (CFHK).

Personal life
Ai is married to artist Lu Qing. He has a son, Ai Lao, born 2009 with Wang Fen. Ai is fond of cats.

Political activity and controversies

Internet activities
In 2005, Ai was invited to start blogging by Sina Weibo, the biggest internet platform in China. He posted his first blog on 19 November. For four years, he "turned out a steady stream of scathing social commentary, criticism of government policy, thoughts on art and architecture, and autobiographical writings." The blog was shut down by Sina on 28 May 2009. Ai then turned to Twitter and wrote prolifically on the platform, claiming at least eight hours online every day. He wrote almost exclusively in Chinese using the account @aiww. As of 31 December 2013, Ai has declared that he would stop tweeting but the account remains active in forms of retweets and Instagram posts. In 2013, Dale Eisinger of Complex ranked Ai's blog as the fourth greatest work of performance art ever, with the writer arguing, "Much in the way early performance artists documented with film and video, Ai used the prevalent medium of his time—the web—to examine the increasingly fine line between public life and the artist's work. Ai here used his presence to create something full and tangible rather than just a symbolic representation of his critique."

Citizens' investigation on Sichuan earthquake student casualties
Ten days after the 8.0-magnitude earthquake in Sichuan province on 12 May 2008, Ai led a team to survey and film the post-quake conditions in various disaster zones. In response to the government's lack of transparency in revealing names of students who perished in the earthquake due to substandard school campus constructions, Ai recruited volunteers online and launched a "Citizens' Investigation" to compile names and information of the student victims. On 20 March 2009, he posted a blog titled "Citizens' Investigation" and wrote: "To remember the departed, to show concern for life, to take responsibility, and for the potential happiness of the survivors, we are initiating a 'Citizens' Investigation.' We will seek out the names of each departed child, and we will remember them."

As of 14 April 2009, the list had accumulated 5,385 names. Ai published the collected names as well as numerous articles documenting the investigation on his blog which was shut down by Chinese authorities in May 2009. He also posted his list of names of schoolchildren who died on the wall of his office at FAKE Design in Beijing.

Ai suffered headaches and claimed he had difficulty concentrating on his work since returning from Chengdu in August 2009, where he was beaten by the police for trying to testify for Tan Zuoren, a fellow investigator of the shoddy construction and student casualties in the earthquake. On 14 September 2009, Ai was diagnosed to be suffering internal bleeding in a hospital in Munich, Germany, and the doctor arranged for emergency brain surgery. The cerebral hemorrhage is believed to be linked to the police attack.

According to the Financial Times, in an attempt to force Ai to leave the country, two accounts used by him had been hacked in a sophisticated attack on Google in China dubbed Operation Aurora, their contents read and copied; his bank accounts were investigated by state security agents who claimed he was under investigation for "unspecified suspected crimes".

Shanghai studio controversy
Ai was placed under house arrest in November 2010 by the Chinese police. He said this was to prevent the planned party marking the demolition of his brand new Shanghai studio.

The building was designed by Ai himself with assistance, and potency coming from a "high official [from Shanghai]" the new studio was a part of a new traditionally design by Shanghai Municipal jurisdiction. He was going to use it as a studio and mentor different architecture courses. After Ai was charged with constructing the studio without the required approval and the knockdown notice had been processed, Ai said officials had been anxious and the paperwork and planning process was "under government supervision". According to Ai, a few different artists were invited to create and structure new studios in this area of Shanghai because officials wanted to create a friendly environment.

Ai stated on 3 November 2010 that authorities had let him know him two months earlier that the newly completed studio would be knocked down because it was illegal and did not meet the needs. Ai criticized that this was biased, stating that he was "the only one singled out to have my studio destroyed". The Guardian reported Ai saying Shanghai municipal authorities were "upset " by documentaries on subjects they considered delicate—in particular a documentary featuring Shanghai resident Feng Zhenghu, who lived in forced separation for three months in Narita Airport, Tokyo, and one focused on Yang Jia, who murdered six Shanghai police officers.

At the end of the term, the gathering took place without Ai. All of his fans had a river crab, an allusion to "harmony", and a euphemism used to jeer official censorship. Ai was eventually released from house arrest the next day.

Like other activists and intellectuals, Ai was stopped from leaving China in late 2010. Ai suggested that the higher ups wanted to stop him from attending a ceremony in December 2010 to award the 2010 Nobel Peace Prize to fellow dissident Liu Xiaobo. Ai said that he was never invited to the ceremony and was attempting to travel to South Korea where he had an important meeting when he was told that he could not leave for reasons of national security.

On 11 January 2011, Ai's studio was knocked down and destroyed in a surprise move by the government, who had previously told him the studio would be destroyed only after the beginning of the New Year on 3 February 2011.

2011 arrest
On 3 April 2011, Ai was arrested at Beijing Capital International Airport just before catching a flight to Hong Kong and his studio facilities were searched. A police contingent of approximately 50 officers came to his studio, threw a cordon around it and searched the premises. They took away laptops and the hard drive from the main computer; along with Ai, police also detained eight staff members and Ai's wife, Lu Qing. Police also visited the mother of Ai's two-year-old son. The Chinese Ministry of Foreign Affairs said on 7 April that Ai was arrested under investigation for alleged economic crimes. Then, on 8 April, police returned to Ai's workshop to examine his financial affairs. On 9 April, Ai's accountant, as well as studio partner Liu Zhenggang and driver Zhang Jingsong, disappeared, while Ai's assistant Wen Tao has remained missing since Ai's arrest on 3 April. Ai's wife said that she was summoned by the Beijing Chaoyang district tax bureau, where she was interrogated about his studio's tax on 12 April. South China Morning Post reports that Ai received at least two visits from the police, the last being on 31 March – three days before his detention – apparently with offers of membership to the Chinese People's Political Consultative Conference. A staff member recalled that Ai had mentioned receiving the offer earlier, "[but Ai] didn't say if it was a membership of the CPPCC at the municipal or national level, how he responded or whether he accepted it or not."

On 24 February, amid an online campaign for Middle East-style protests in major Chinese cities by overseas dissidents, Ai posted on his Twitter account: "I didn't care about jasmine at first, but people who are scared by jasmine sent out information about how harmful jasmine is often, which makes me realize that jasmine is what scares them the most. What a jasmine!"

Response to Ai's arrest

Analysts and other activists said Ai had been widely thought to be untouchable, but Nicholas Bequelin from Human Rights Watch suggested that his arrest, calculated to send the message that no one would be immune, must have had the approval of someone in the top leadership. International governments, human rights groups and art institutions, among others, called for Ai's release, while Chinese officials did not notify Ai's family of his whereabouts.

State media started describing Ai as a "deviant and a plagiarist" in early 2011. A Chinese Communist Party tabloid Global Times editorial on 6 April 2011 attacked Ai, and two days later, the journal scorned Western media for questioning Ai's charge as a "catch-all crime", and denounced the use of his political activism as a "legal shield" against everyday crimes. Frank Ching expressed in the South China Morning Post that how the Global Times could radically shift its position from one day to the next was reminiscent of Alice in Wonderland.

Michael Sheridan of The Times suggested that Ai had offered himself to the authorities on a platter with some of his provocative art, particularly photographs of himself nude with only a toy alpaca hiding his modesty – with a caption『草泥马挡中央』 ("grass mud horse covering the middle"). The term possesses a double meaning in Chinese: one possible interpretation was given by Sheridan as: "Fuck your mother, the party central committee".

Ming Pao in Hong Kong reacted strongly to the state media's character attack on Ai, saying that authorities had employed "a chain of actions outside the law, doing further damage to an already weak system of laws, and to the overall image of the country." Pro-Beijing newspaper in Hong Kong, Wen Wei Po, announced that Ai was under arrest for tax evasion, bigamy and spreading indecent images on the internet, and vilified him with multiple instances of strong rhetoric. Supporters said "the article should be seen as a mainland media commentary attacking Ai, rather than as an accurate account of the investigation."

The United States and European Union protested Ai's detention. The international arts community also mobilised petitions calling for the release of Ai: "1001 Chairs for Ai Weiwei" was organized by Creative Time of New York that calls for artists to bring chairs to Chinese embassies and consulates around the world on 17 April 2011, at 1 pm local time "to sit peacefully in support of the artist's immediate release."> Artists in Hong Kong, Germany and Taiwan demonstrated and called for Ai to be released.

One of the major protests by U.S. museums took place on 19 and 20 May when the Museum of Contemporary Art San Diego organized a 24-hour silent protest in which volunteer participants, including community members, media, and museum staff, occupied two traditionally styled Chinese chairs for one-hour periods. The 24-hour sit-in referenced Ai's sculpture series, Marble Chair, two of which were on view and were subsequently acquired for the museum's permanent collection.

The Solomon R. Guggenheim Foundation and the International Council of Museums, which organised petitions, said they had collected more than 90,000 signatures calling for the release of Ai. On 13 April 2011, a group of European intellectuals led by Václav Havel had issued an open letter to Wen Jiabao, condemning the arrest and demanding the immediate release of Ai. The signatories include Ivan Klíma, Jiří Gruša, Jáchym Topol, Elfriede Jelinek, Adam Michnik, Adam Zagajewski, Helmuth Frauendorfer; Bei Ling (Chinese:贝岭), a Chinese poet in exile drafted and also signed the open letter.

On 16 May 2011, the Chinese authorities allowed Ai's wife to visit him briefly. Liu Xiaoyuan, his attorney and personal friend, reported that Wei was in good physical condition and receiving treatment for his chronic diabetes and hypertension; he was not in a prison or hospital but under some form of house arrest.

He is the subject of the 2012 documentary film Ai Weiwei: Never Sorry, directed by American filmmaker Alison Klayman, which received a special jury prize at the 2012 Sundance Film Festival and opened the Hot Docs Canadian International Documentary Festival, North America's largest documentary festival, in Toronto on 26 April 2012.

Release
On 22 June 2011, the Chinese authorities released Ai from jail after almost three months' detention on charges of tax evasion. Beijing Fa Ke Cultural Development Ltd., a company Ai controlled, had allegedly evaded taxes and intentionally destroyed accounting documents. State media also reports that Ai was granted bail on account of Ai's "good attitude in confessing his crimes", willingness to pay back taxes, and his chronic illnesses. According to the Chinese Foreign Ministry, he was prohibited from leaving Beijing without permission for one year. Ai's supporters widely viewed his detention as retaliation for his vocal criticism of the government. On 23 June 2011, professor Wang Yujin of China University of Political Science and Law stated that the release of Ai on bail shows that the Chinese government could not find any solid evidence of Ai's alleged "economic crime". On 24 June 2011, Ai told a Radio Free Asia reporter that he was thankful for the support of the Hong Kong public, and praised Hong Kong's conscious society. Ai also mentioned that his detention by the Chinese regime was hellish (Chinese: 九死一生), and stressed that he is forbidden to say too much to reporters.

After his release, his sister gave some details about his detention condition to the press, explaining that he was subjected to a kind of psychological torture: he was detained in a tiny room with constant light, and two guards were set very close to him at all times, and watched him constantly. In November, Chinese authorities were again investigating Ai and his associates, this time under the charge of spreading pornography.
Lu was subsequently questioned by police, and released after several hours though the exact charges remain unclear.
In January 2012, in its International Review issue Art in America magazine featured an interview with Ai Weiwei at his home in China. J.J. Camille (the pen name of a Chinese-born writer living in New York), "neither a journalist nor an activist but simply an art lover who wanted to talk to him" had travelled to Beijing the previous September to conduct the interview and to write about his visit to "China's most famous dissident artist" for the magazine.

On 21 June 2012, Ai's bail was lifted. Although he was allowed to leave Beijing, the police informed him that he was still prohibited from traveling to other countries because he is "suspected of other crimes", including pornography, bigamy and illicit exchange of foreign currency. Until 2015, he remained under heavy surveillance and restrictions of movement, but continued to criticize through his work. In July 2015, he was given a passport and permitted to travel abroad.

Ai says that at the beginning of his detention he was proud of being detained much like his father had been earlier. He also says it allowed him to try a dialogue with the authorities, something which had never been possible before.

Tax case
In June 2011, the Beijing Local Taxation Bureau demanded a total of over 12 million yuan (US$1.85  million) from Beijing Fa Ke Cultural Development Ltd. in unpaid taxes and fines, and accorded three days to appeal the demand in writing. According to Ai's wife, Beijing Fa Ke Cultural Development Ltd. has hired two Beijing lawyers as defense attorneys. Ai's family state that Ai is "neither the chief executive nor the legal representative of the design company, which is registered in his wife's name."

Offers of donations poured in from Ai's fans across the world when the fine was announced. Eventually, an online loan campaign was initiated on 4 November 2011, and close to 9 million RMB was collected within ten days, from 30,000 contributions. Notes were folded into paper planes and thrown over the studio walls, and donations were made in symbolic amounts such as 8964 (4 June 1989, Tiananmen Massacre) or 512 (12 May 2008, Sichuan earthquake). To thank creditors and acknowledge the contributions as loans, Ai designed and issued loan receipts to all who participated in the campaign. Funds raised from the campaign were used as collateral, required by law for an appeal on the tax case. Lawyers acting for Ai submitted an appeal against the fine in January 2012; the Chinese government subsequently agreed to conduct a review.

In June 2012, the court heard the tax appeal case. Ai's wife, Lu Qing, the legal representative of the design company, attended the hearing. Lu was accompanied by several lawyers and an accountant, but the witnesses they had requested to testify, including Ai, were prevented from attending a court hearing. Ai asserts that the entire matter – including the 81 days he spent in jail in 2011 – is intended to suppress his provocations. Ai said he had no illusions as to how the case would turn out, as he believes the court will protect the government's own interests. On 20 June, hundreds of Ai's supporters gathered outside the Chaoyang District Court in Beijing despite a small army of police officers, some of whom videotaped the crowd and led several people away. On 20 July, Ai's tax appeal was rejected in court. The same day Ai's studio released "The Fake Case" which tracks the status and history of this case including a timeline and the release of official documents. On 27 September, the court upheld the  tax evasion fine. Ai had previously deposited  in a government-controlled account in order to appeal. Ai said he will not pay the remainder because he does not recognize the charge.

In October 2012, authorities revoked the license of Beijing Fa Ke Cultural Development Ltd. for failing to re-register, an annual requirement by the administration. The company was not able to complete this procedure as its materials and stamps were confiscated by the government.

"15 Years of Chinese Contemporary Art Award (CCAA)" – Power Station of Art, Shanghai, 2014
On 26 April 2014, Ai's name was removed from a group show taking place at the Shanghai Power Station of Art. The exhibition was held to celebrate the fifteenth anniversary of the art prize created by Uli Sigg in 1998, with the purpose of promoting and developing Chinese contemporary art. Ai won the Lifetime Contribution Award in 2008 and was part of the jury during the first three editions of the prize. He was then invited to take part in the group show together with the other selected Chinese artists. Shortly before the exhibition's opening, some museum workers removed his name from the list of winners and jury members painted on a wall. Also, Ai's works Sunflower Seeds and Stools were removed from the show and kept in a museum office (see photo on Ai Weiwei's Instagram). Sigg declared that it was not his decision and that it was a decision of the Power Station of Art and the Shanghai Municipal Bureau of Culture.

"Hans van Dijk: 5000 Names – UCCA"
In May 2014, the Ullens Center for Contemporary Art, a non-profit art center situated in the 798 art district of Beijing, held a retrospective exhibition in honor of the late curator and scholar, Hans Van Dijk. Ai, a good friend of Hans and a fellow co-founder of the China Art Archives and Warehouse (CAAW), participated in the exhibition with three artworks. On the day of the opening, Ai realized his name was omitted from both Chinese and English versions of the exhibition's press release. Ai's assistants went to the art center and removed his works. It is Ai's belief that, in omitting his name, the museum altered the historical record of van Dijk's work with him. Ai started his own research about what actually happened, and between 23 and 25 May he interviewed the UCCA's director, Philip Tinari, the guest curator of the exhibition, Marianne Brouwer, and the UCCA chief, Xue Mei. He published the transcripts of the interviews on Instagram. In one of the interviews, the CEO of the UCCA, Xue Mei, admitted that, due to the sensitive time of the exhibition, Ai's name was taken out of the press releases on the day of the opening and it was supposed to be restored afterwards. This was to avoid problems with the Chinese authorities, who threatened to arrest her.

Support for Julian Assange
Ai has long advocated for the release of Julian Assange. In 2016, he co-signed a letter which stated that the UK and Sweden were undermining the UN by ignoring the findings of a UN working group that found Assange was being arbitrarily detained. The letter called on the UK and Sweden to guarantee Assange's freedom of movement and provide compensation. Ai visited Assange in high security Belmarsh Prison after his arrest by the UK. In September 2019, Ai held a silent protest in support of Assange outside London's Old Bailey court where Assange's extradition hearing was being held. Ai called for Assange's freedom and said "He truly represents the very core value of why we are fighting, the freedom of the press".

In 2021, Ai was invited to submit a piece for the virtual UK art exhibition The Great Big Art Exhibition, which was organised by Firstsite. Ai's piece, called Postcard for Political Prisoners, incorporated a photograph of the running machine used by Assange in the Ecuadorian embassy. After initially accepting Ai's idea, Firstsite's director said that it could not include his project "due to time constraints, and because it did not fit with the concept of the exhibition". Ai said he thought the reason for the rejection was that the exhibition did not "want to touch on a topic like Assange".

Artistic works

Weiwei is often referred to as China's most famous artist. He has created works that focus on human rights abuses using video, photography, wallpaper, and porcelain.

Documentaries
Beijing video works

From 2003 to 2005, Ai Weiwei recorded the results of Beijing's developing urban infrastructure and its social conditions.

Beijing 2003
2003, Video, 150 hours

Beginning under the Dabeiyao highway interchange, the vehicle from which Beijing 2003 was shot traveled every road within the Fourth Ring Road of Beijing and documented the road conditions. Approximately 2400 kilometers and 150 hours of footage later, it ended where it began under the Dabeiyao highway interchange. The documentation of these winding alleyways of the city center – now largely torn down for redevelopment – preserved a visual record of the city that is free of aesthetic judgment.

Chang'an Boulevard
2004, Video, 10h 13m

Moving from east to west, Chang'an Boulevard traverses Beijing's most iconic avenue. Along the boulevard's 45-kilometer length, it recorded the changing densities of its far-flung suburbs, central business districts, and political core. At each 50-meter increment, the artist records a single frame for one minute. The work reveals the rhythm of Beijing as a capital city, its social structure, cityscape, socialist-planned economy, capitalist market, political power center, commercial buildings, and industrial units as pieces of a multi-layered urban collage.

Beijing: The Second Ring
2005, Video, 1h 6m

Beijing: The Third Ring
2005 Video, 1h 50m

Beijing: The Second Ring and Beijing: The Third Ring capture two opposite views of traffic flow on every bridge of each Ring Road, the innermost arterial highways of Beijing. The artist records a single frame for one minute for each view on the bridge. Beijing: The Second Ring was entirely shot on cloudy days, while the segments for Beijing: The Third Ring were entirely shot on sunny days. The films document the historic aspects and modern development of a city with a population of nearly 11 million people.

Fairytale
2007, video, 2h 32m

Fairytale covers Ai Weiwei's project Fairytale, part of Europe's most innovative five-year art event Documenta 12 in Kassel, Germany in 2007. Ai invited 1001 Chinese citizens of different ages and from various backgrounds to travel to Kassel, Germany to experience a fairytale of their own.
The 152-minute long film documents the ideation and process of staging Fairytale and covering project preparations, participants' challenges, and travel to Germany.

Along with this documentary, Fairytale was documented through written materials and photographs of participants and artifacts from the event.

Fairytale was an act of social subversion, improving relationships between China and the West through interactions among participants and the citizens of Kassel. Ai Weiwei felt that he was able to make a positive influence on both participants of Fairytale and Kassel citizens.

Little Girl's Cheeks
2008, video, 1h 18m

On 15 December 2008, a citizens' investigation began with the goal of seeking an explanation for the casualties of the Sichuan earthquake that happened on 12 May 2008. The investigation covered 14 counties and 74 townships within the disaster zone, and studied the conditions of 153 schools that were affected by the earthquake.
By gathering and confirming comprehensive details about the students, such as their age, region, school, and grade, the group managed to affirm that there were 5,192 students who perished in the disaster.
Among a hundred volunteers, 38 of them participated in fieldwork, with 25 of them being controlled by the Sichuan police for a total of 45 times.
This documentary is a structural element of the citizens' investigation.

4851
2009, looped video, 1h 27m

At 14:28 on 12 May 2008, an 8.0-magnitude earthquake happened in Sichuan, China. Over 5,000 students in primary and secondary schools perished in the earthquake, yet their names went unannounced. In reaction to the government's lack of transparency, a citizen's investigation was initiated to find out their names and details about their schools and families.
As of 2 September 2009, there were 4,851 confirmed. This video is a tribute to these perished students and a memorial for innocent lives lost.

A Beautiful Life
2009, video, 48m

This video documents the story of Chinese citizen Feng Zhenghu and his struggles to return home.

In 2009, authorities in Shanghai prevented Feng Zhenghu, who was originally from Wenzhou, Zhejiang, from returning home a total of eight times that year. On 4 November 2009 Feng Zhenghu attempted to return home for the ninth time but instead Chinese police forcibly put him on a flight to Japan. Upon arrival at Narita Airport outside of Tokyo, Feng refused to enter Japan and decided to live in the Immigration Hall at Terminal 1, as an act of protest. He relied on gifts of food from tourists for sustenance and lived in a passageway in the Narita Airport for 92 days. He posted updates over Twitter which attracted international media coverage and concern from Chinese netizens and international communities.

On 31 January, Feng announced an end to his protest at the Narita Airport. On 12 February Feng was allowed to re-enter China, where he reunited with his family at their home in Shanghai.
Ai Weiwei and his assistant Gao Yuan, went from Beijing to interview Feng Zhenghu three times at Narita Airport, on 16 November, 20 November 2009 and 31 January 2010 and documented his stay in the airport passageway and the entire process of his return to China.

Disturbing the Peace (Laoma Tihua)
2009, video, 1h 19m

Ai Weiwei studio production Laoma Tihua is a documentary of an incident during Tan Zuoren's trial on 12 August 2009. Tan Zuoren was charged with "inciting subversion of state power". Chengdu police detained witnessed during the trial of the civil rights advocate, which is an obstruction of justice and violence.
Tan Zuoren was charged as a result of his research and questioning regarding the 5.12 Wenchuan students' casualties and the corruption resulting poor building construction. Tan Zuoren was sentenced to five years of prison.

One Recluse
2010, video, 3h

In June 2008, Yang Jia carried a knife, a hammer, a gas mask, pepper spray, gloves and Molotov cocktails to the Zhabei Public Security Branch Bureau and killed six police officers, injuring another police officer and a guard. He was arrested on the scene, and was subsequently charged with intentional homicide. In the following six months, while Yang Jia was detained and trials were held, his mother has mysteriously disappeared.
This video is a documentary that traces the reasons and motivations behind the tragedy and investigates into a trial process filled with shady cover-ups and questionable decisions. The film provides a glimpse into the realities of a government-controlled judicial system and its impact on the citizens' lives.

Hua Hao Yue Yuan
2010, video, 2h 6m

"The future dictionary definition of 'crackdown' will be: First cover one's head up firmly, and then beat him or her up violently". – @aiww
In the summer of 2010, the Chinese government began a crackdown on dissent, and Hua Hao Yue Yuan documents the stories of Liu Dejun and Liu Shasha, whose activism and outspoken attitude led them to violent abuse from the authorities. On separate occasions, they were kidnapped, beaten and thrown into remote locations. The incidents attracted much concern over the Internet, as well as wide speculation and theories about what exactly happened. This documentary presents interviews of the two victims, witnesses and concerned netizens. In which it gathers various perspectives about the two beatings, and brings us closer to the brutal reality of China's "crackdown on crime".

Remembrance
2010, voice recording, 3h 41m

On 24 April 2010 at 00:51, Ai Weiwei (@aiww) started a Twitter campaign to commemorate students who perished in the earthquake in Sichuan on 12 May 2008. 3,444 friends from the Internet delivered voice recordings, the names of 5,205 perished were recited 12,140 times.
Remembrance is an audio work dedicated to the young people who lost their lives in the Sichuan earthquake. It expresses thoughts for the passing of innocent lives and indignation for the cover-ups on truths about sub-standard architecture, which led to the large number of schools that collapsed during the earthquake.

San Hua
2010, video, 1h 8m

The shooting and editing of this video lasted nearly seven months at the Ai Weiwei studio. It began near the end of 2007 in an interception organized by cat-saving volunteers in Tianjin, and the film locations included Tianjin, Shanghai, Rugao of Jiangsu, Chaoshan of Guangzhou, and Hebei Province. The documentary depicts a complete picture of a chain in the cat-trading industry.
Since the end of 2009 when the government began soliciting expert opinion for the Animal Protection Act, the focus of public debate has always been on whether one should be eating cats or not, or whether cat-eating is a Chinese tradition or not. There are even people who would go as far as to say that the call to stop eating cat meat is "imposing the will of the minority on the majority". Yet the "majority" does not understand the complete truth of cat-meat trading chains: cat theft, cat trafficking, killing cats, selling cats, and eating cats, all the various stages of the trade and how they are distributed across the country, in cities such as Beijing, Tianjin, Shanghai, Nanjing, Suzhou, Wuxi, Rugao, Wuhan, Guangzhou, and Hebei.

Ordos 100
2011, video, 1h 1m

This documentary is about the construction project curated by Herzog & de Meuron and Ai Weiwei. One hundred architects from 27 countries were chosen to participate and design a 1000 square meter villa to be built in a new community in Inner Mongolia. The 100 villas would be designed to fit a master plan designed by Ai Weiwei. On 25 January 2008, the 100 architects gathered in Ordos for a first site visit. The film Ordos 100 documents the total of three site visits to Ordos, during which time the master plan and design of each villa was completed. As of 2016, the Ordos 100 project remains unrealized.

So Sorry

2011, video, 54m

As a sequel to Ai Weiwei's film Lao Ma Ti Hua, the film so sorry (named after the artist's 2009 exhibition in Munich, Germany) shows the beginnings of the tension between Ai Weiwei and the Chinese Government. In Lao Ma Ti Hua, Ai Weiwei travels to Chengdu, Sichuan to attend the trial of the civil rights advocate Tan Zuoren, as a witness. So Sorry shows the investigation led by Ai Weiwei studio to identify the students who died during the Sichuan earthquake as a result of corruption and poor building constructions leading to the confrontation between Ai Weiwei and the Chengdu police. After being beaten by the police, Ai Weiwei traveled to Munich, Germany to prepare his exhibition at the museum Haus der Kunst. The result of his beating led to intense headaches caused by a brain hemorrhage and was treated by emergency surgery. These events mark the beginning of Ai Weiwei's struggle and surveillance at the hands of the state police.

Ping'an Yueqing
2011, video, 2h 22m

This documentary investigates the death of popular Zhaiqiao village leader Qian Yunhui in the fishing village of Yueqing, Zhejiang province. When the local government confiscated marshlands in order to convert them into construction land, the villagers were deprived of the opportunity to cultivate these lands and be fully self-subsistent. Qian Yunhui, unafraid of speaking up for his villagers, travelled to Beijing several times to report this injustice to the central government. In order to silence him, he was detained by local government repeatedly. On 25 December 2010, Qian Yunhui was hit by a truck and died on the scene. News of the incident and photos of the scene quickly spread over the internet. The local government claimed that Qian Yunhui was the victim of an ordinary traffic accident. This film is an investigation conducted by Ai Weiwei studio into the circumstances of the incident and its connection to the land dispute case, mainly based on interviews of family members, villagers and officials. It is an attempt by Ai Weiwei to establish the facts and find out what really happened on 25 December 2010.
During shooting and production, Ai Weiwei studio experienced significant obstruction and resistance from local government. The film crew was followed, sometimes physically stopped from shooting certain scenes and there were even attempts to buy off footage. All villagers interviewed for the purposes of this documentary have been interrogated or illegally detained by local government to some extent.

The Crab House
2011, video, 1h 1m

Early in 2008, the district government of Jiading, Shanghai invited Ai Weiwei to build a studio in Malu Township, as a part of the local government's efforts in developing its cultural assets. By August 2010, the Ai Weiwei Shanghai Studio completed all of its construction work. In October 2010, the Shanghai government declared the Ai Weiwei Shanghai Studio an illegal construction, and it was subjected to demolition. On 7 November 2010, when Ai Weiwei was placed under house arrest by public security in Beijing, over 1,000 netizens attended the "River Crab Feast" at the Shanghai Studio. On 11 January 2011, the Shanghai city government forcibly demolished the Ai Weiwei Studio within a day, without any prior notice.

Stay Home
2013, video, 1h 17m

This video tells the story of Liu Ximei, who at her birth in 1985 was given to relatives to be raised because she was born in violation of China's strict one-child policy. When she was ten years old, Liu was severely injured while working in the fields and lost large amounts of blood. While undergoing treatment at a local hospital, she was given a blood transfusion that was later revealed to be contaminated with HIV. Following this exposure to the virus, Liu contracted AIDS. According to official statistics, in 2001 there were 850,000 AIDS sufferers in China, many of whom contracted the illness in the 1980s and 1990s as the result of a widespread plasma market operating in rural, impoverished areas and using unsafe collection methods.

Ai Weiwei's Appeal ¥15,220,910.50
2014, video, 2h 8m

Ai Weiwei's Appeal ¥15,220,910.50 opens with Ai Weiwei's mother at the Venice Biennial in the summer of 2013 examining Ai's large S.A.C.R.E.D. installation portraying his 81-day imprisonment. The documentary goes onto chronologically reconstruct the events that occurred from the time he was arrested at the Beijing airport in April 2011 to his final court appeal in September 2012. The film portrays the day-to-day activity surrounding Ai Weiwei, his family and his associates ranging from consistent visits by the authorities, interviews with reporters, support and donations from fans, and court dates. The Film premiered at the International Film Festival Rotterdam on 23 January 2014.

Fukushima Art Project
2015, video, 30m

This documentary on the Fukushima Art Project is about artist Ai Weiwei's investigation of the site as well as the project's installation process. In August 2014, Ai Weiwei was invited as one of the participating artists for the Fukushima Nuclear Zone by the Japanese art coalition Chim↑Pom, as part of the project Don't Follow the Wind. Ai accepted the invitation and sent his assistant Ma Yan to the exclusion zone in Japan to investigate the site. The Fukushima Exclusion Zone is thus far located within the 20-kilometer radius of land area of the Fukushima Daiichi Nuclear Power Plant. 25,000 people have already been evacuated from the Exclusion Zone. Both water and electric circuits were cut off. Entrance restriction is expected to be relieved in the next thirty years, or even longer. The art project will also be open to public at that time. The three spots usable as exhibition spaces by the artists are all former residential houses, among which exhibition sites one and two were used for working and lodging; and exhibition site three was used as a community entertainment facility with an ostrich farm.
Ai brought about two projects, A Ray of Hope and Family Album after analyzing materials and information generated from the site.
In A Ray of Hope, a solar photovoltaic system is built on exhibition site one, on the second level of the old warehouse. Integral LED lighting devices are used in the two rooms. The lights would turn on automatically from 7 to 10pm, and from 6 to 8am daily. This lighting system is the only light source in the Exclusion Zone after this project was installed.
Photos of Ai and his studio staff at Caochangdi that make up project Family Album are displayed on exhibition site two and three, in the seven rooms where locals used to live. The twenty-two selected photos are divided in five categories according to types of events spanning eight years. Among these photos, six of them were taken from the site investigation at the 2008 Sichuan earthquake; two were taken during the time when he was illegally detained after pleading the Tan Zuoren case in Chengdu, China in August 2009; and three others taken during his surgical treatment for his head injury from being attacked in the head by police officers in Chengdu; five taken of him being followed by the police and his Beijing studio Fake Design under surveillance due to the studio tax case from 2011 to 2012; four are photos of Ai Weiwei and his family from year 2011 to year 2013; and the other two were taken earlier of him in his studio in Caochangdi (One taken in 2005 and the other in 2006).

Human Flow

A feature documentary directed by Weiwei and co-produced by Andy Cohen about the global refugee crisis.

Coronation

A feature-length documentary directed by Weiwei about happenings in Wuhan, China during the COVID-19 pandemic. When discussing the film Weiwei claimed "it's obvious the disease is not from an animal. It's not a natural disease, it's something that's leaked out, after years of research."

Visual arts

Ai's visual art includes sculptural installations, woodworking, video and photography. "Ai Weiwei: According to What", adapted and expanded by the Hirshhorn Museum and Sculpture Garden from a 2009 exhibition at Tokyo's Mori Art Museum, was Ai's first North American museum retrospective. It opened at the Hirshhorn in Washington, D.C. in 2013, and subsequently traveled to the Brooklyn Museum, New York,
 and two other venues. His works address his investigation into the aftermath of the Sichuan earthquake and responses to the Chinese government's detention and surveillance of him. His recent public pieces have called attention to the Syrian refugee crisis.

Dropping a Han Dynasty Urn

(1995) Performance in which Ai lets an ancient ceramic urn fall from his hands and smash to pieces on the ground. The performance was memorialized in a series of three photographic still frames.

Map of China
(2008) Sculpture resembling a park bench or tree trunk, but its cross-section is a map of China. It is four metres long and weighs 635 kilograms. It is made from wood salvaged from Qing dynasty temples.

Table with two legs on the wall
(2008) Ming dynasty table cut in half and rejoined at a right angle to rest two feet on the wall and two on the floor. The reconstruction was completed using Chinese period specific joinery techniques.

Straight
(2008–2012) 150 tons of twisted steel reinforcements recovered from the 2008 Sichuan earthquake building collapse sites were straightened out and displayed as an installation.

Sunflower Seeds

(2010) In October 2010, at the Tate Modern in London, Ai displayed 100 million handmade and painted porcelain sunflower seeds. The work as installed was called 1-125,000,000 and subsequent installations have been titled Sunflower Seeds. The initial installation had the seeds spread across the floor of the Turbine Hall in a thin 10 cm layer. The seeds weigh about 10 metric tonnes and were made by artisans over two and a half years by 1,600 Jingdezhen artisans in a city where porcelain had been made for over a thousand years. The sculpture refers to chairman Mao's rule and the Chinese Communist Party. The mass of tiny seeds represents that, together, the people of China can stand up and overthrow the Chinese Communist Party. The seeds also refer to China's current mass automated production, based on Western consumerist culture. The sculpture challenges the "Made in China" mantra, memorialising labour-intensive traditional methods of crafting objects.

Surveillance Camera
(2010) Ai WeiWei's marble sculpture resembles a Surveillance Camera to express the alarming rate of how technological advancements are being used in the modern world. WeiWei created this sculpture in response to the Chinese Government surveilling and incorporating listening devices in and around his studio, located in Beijing. The Chinese government did this as punishment for WeiWei's outspoken criticism of the Chinese Government.

He Xie/Crab
(2010) Sculptures of a large amount of crabs.

Circle of Animals/Zodiac Heads
(2011) Circle of Animals/Zodiac Heads are sculptures of zodiac animals inspired by the water clock-fountain at the Old Summer Palace.

Belongings of Ye Haiyan

(2013) Ye Haiyan's (叶海燕) Belongings is a collaborative piece between Ai Weiwei and Ye Haiyan. Ye, also referred to as "Hooligan Sparrow", is an activist for women's rights and sex worker's rights. After consistent surveillance and harassment for her outspoken activism as chronicled in Nanfu Wang's documentary Hooligan Sparrow, Haiyan and her daughter were met with multiple evictions in various cities and ultimately ended up on the side of the road with all of their belongings and no place to go. Ai Weiwei was able to help them financially and included this piece in his exhibition "According to What?". The display consists of four walls which display pictures of Haiyan, her daughter, and their life's belongings that they packed quickly prior to their first eviction. In the center, Ai recreated their belongings before they were confiscated. The whole arrangement demonstrates the realities of publicly speaking out against injustices in China.

Coca-Cola Vases
(1994) Han dynasty vases with the Coca-Cola logo brushed onto them is one of the artists' longest running series, begun in 1994 and continuing to the present day.

Grapes
(2014) 32 Qing dynasty stools joined together in a cluster with legs pointing out.

Free-speech Puzzle
(2014) Individual porcelain ornaments, each painted with characters for "free speech", which when set together form a map of China.

Trace
(2014) Consisting of 176 2D-portraits in Lego which are set onto a large floor space, Trace was commissioned by the FOR-SITE Foundation, the United States National Park Service and the Golden Gate Park Conservancy. The original installation was at Alcatraz Prison in San Francisco Bay; the 176 portraits being of various political prisoners and prisoners of conscience. After seeing one million visitors during its one-year display at Alcatraz, the installation was moved and put on display at the Hirshhorn Museum in Washington, D.C. (in a modified form; the pieces had to be arranged to fit the circular floor space). The display at the Hirshhorn ran from 28 June 2017 – 1 January 2018. The display also included two versions of his wallpaper work The Animal That Looks Like a Llama but Is Really an Alpaca and a video running on a loop.

The 2019 documentary film Yours Truly covered the creation of Trace and an associated exhibit, Yours Truly, also at Alcatraz, where visitors could write postcards to be sent to selected political prisoners.

Law of the Journey
(2017) As the culmination of Ai's experiences visiting 40 refugee camps in 2016, Law of the Journey featured an all-black,  inflatable boat carrying 258 faceless refugee figures. The art piece is currently on display at the National Gallery in Prague until 7 January 2018.

Two Iron Trees at The Shrine of Book
(2017) Permanent exhibit, unique setting of two Iron Trees from now on frame the Shrine of the Book in Jerusalem, Israel where Dead Sea Scrolls are preserved.

Journey of Laziz
(2017) The exhibition was on the view in the Israel Museum until the end of October 2017. Journey of Laziz is a video installation, showing the mental breakdown and overall suffering of a tiger living in the "world's worst zoo" in Gaza.

Hansel and Gretel 
(2017) The exhibition at the Park Avenue Armory from 7 June- 6 August 2017, Hansel and Gretel was an installation exploring the theme of surveillance. The project, a collaboration of Ai Weiwei and architects Jacques Herzog and Pierre de Meuron, features surveillance cameras equipped with facial recognition software, near-infrared floor projections, tethered, autonomous drones and sonar beacons. A companion website includes a curatorial statement, artist biographies, a livestream of the installation and a timeline of surveillance technology from ancient to modern times.

The Animal That Looks Like a Llama but Is Really an Alpaca 
(2017) The Animal That Looks Like a Llama but Is Really an Alpaca, and its companion piece The Plain Version of The Animal That Looks Like a Llama but Is Really an Alpaca, is a wallpaper work consisting of intricate tiled patterns showing various pieces of surveillance equipment in whimsical arrangements. The two pieces were installed at the Hirshhorn Museum in Washington, D.C., as part of a full-floor exhibition of his work that also included a video and the 2014 installation Trace.

man in a cube 
(2017) Ai Weiwei created the sculpture man in a cube for the exhibition Luther and the Avantgarde in Wittenberg to mark the 2017 quincentenary of the Reformation. In it, the artist worked through his experiences of anxiety and isolation following his arrest by Chinese authorities: "My work is physically a concrete block, which contains within it a single figure in solitude. That figure is the likeness of myself during my eighty-one days under secret detention in 2011." Concentrating on ideas and language helped Ai Weiwei endure his imprisonment. He was also intrigued by the connectedness of freedom, language and ideas in Martin Luther, to whom he explicitly paid tribute with man in a cube.
Once the exhibition in Wittenberg closed, the Stiftung Lutherhaus Eisenach endeavored to make this exceptional manifestation of contemporary Reformation commemoration, man in a cube, permanently accessible to a wide audience. Thanks to the generous support of numerous backers, the museum managed to acquire the sculpture in 2019. It was erected in the courtyard of the Lutherhaus and presented to the public in a ceremony the following year, the five hundredth anniversary of the publication of Martin Luther's treatise On the Freedom of a Christian.

Good Fences Make Good Neighbors 
Ai Weiwei's 2017–18 New York City-wide public art exhibition.

Forever Bicycles 
Forever Bicycles is a  sculpture made of many interconnected bicycles. The sculpture was installed as 1,300 bicycles in Austin, Texas, in 2017. The sculpture was moved to The Forks in Winnipeg, Manitoba, Canada, and reassembled as 1,254 bicycles in 2019.

The  sculpture's bicycles are made to resemble the Shanghai Forever Co. bicycles that were financially out of reach for the artist's family during his youth.

Forever 
A sculpture of many bicycles is displayed as public art in the gardens of the Artz Pedregal shopping mall in Mexico City since its opening in March 2018, and it is part of Fundación Arte Abierto's collection.

Priceless 
A collaboration with conceptual artist Kevin Abosch primarily made up of two standard ERC-20 tokens on the Ethereum blockchain, called PRICELESS (PRCLS is its symbol). One of these tokens is forever unavailable to anyone, but the other is meant for distribution and is divisible up to 18 decimal places, meaning it can be given away one quintillionth at a time. A nominal amount of the distributable token was "burned" (put into digital wallets with the keys thrown away), and these wallet addresses were printed on paper and sold to art buyers in a series of 12 physical works. Each wallet address alphanumeric is a proxy for a shared moment between Abosch and Ai.

Er Xi
A monstrous sculptures at Le Bon Marché in Paris to "speak to our inner child". Artist Ai Weiwei has used traditional Chinese kite-making techniques to create mythological characters and creatures for windows, atriums and the gallery at Paris department store Le Bon Marché (+ slideshow). Er Xi opened on 16 January 2016 until 20 February 2016 at Le Bon Marché Rive Gauche, located on Rue de Sèvres in Paris' 7th arrondissement.

Architecture
Ai Weiwei is also a notable architect known for his collaborations with Herzog & de Meuron and Wang Shu. In 2005, Ai was invited by Wang Shu as an external teacher of the Architecture Department of China Academy of Art.

Jinhua Park

In 2002, he was the curator of the project Jinhua Architecture Park.

Tsai Residence
In 2006, Ai and HHF Architects designed a private residence in upstate New York. According to The New York Times, the Tsai Residence is divided into four modules and the details are "extraordinarily refined". In 2009, the Chicago Athenaeum Museum of Architecture and Design selected the home for its International Architecture Awards, one of the world's most prestigious global awards for new architecture, landscape architecture, interiors and urban planning. In 2010, Wallpaper* magazine nominated the residence for its Wallpaper Design Awards category: Best New Private House. A detached guesthouse, also designed by Ai and HHF Architects, was completed after the main house and, according to New York Magazine, looks like a "floating boomerang of rusty Cor-Ten steel".

Ordos 100
In 2008, Ai curated the architecture project Ordos 100 in Ordos City, Inner Mongolia. He invited 100 architects from 29 countries to participate in this project.

Beijing National Stadium

Ai was commissioned as the artistic consultant for design, collaborating with the Swiss firm Herzog & de Meuron, for the Beijing National Stadium for the 2008 Summer Olympics, also known as the "Bird's Nest". Although ignored by the Chinese media, he had voiced his anti-Olympics views. He later distanced himself from the project, saying, "I've already forgotten about it. I turn down all the demands to have photographs with it," saying it is part of a "pretend smile" of bad taste. In August 2007, he also accused those choreographing the Olympic opening ceremony, including Steven Spielberg and Zhang Yimou, of failing to live up to their responsibility as artists. Ai said "It's disgusting. I don't like anyone who shamelessly abuses their profession, who makes no moral judgment." In February 2008, Spielberg withdrew from his role as advisor to the 2008 Summer Olympics. When asked why he participated in the designing of the Bird's Nest in the first place, Ai replied "I did it because I love design."

Serpentine Pavilion
In summer 2012, Ai teamed again with Herzog & de Meuron on a "would-be archaeological site [as] a game of make-believe and fleeting memory" as the year's temporary Serpentine Gallery Pavilion in London's Kensington Gardens.

Books

Venice Elegy 
This edition of Yang Lian's poems and Ai Weiwei's visual images was realized by the publishing house Damocle Edizioni – Venice in 200 numbered copies on Fabriano Paper. The book was printed in Venice, May 2018. Every book is hand signed by Yang Lian and Ai Weiwei.

Traces of Survival 
In December 2014 Ruya Foundation for Contemporary Culture in Iraq provided drawing materials to three refugee camps in Iraq: Camp Shariya, Camp Baharka and Mar Elia Camp. Ruya Foundation collected over 500 submissions. A number of these images were then selected by Ai Weiwei for a major publication, Traces of Survival: Drawings by Refugees in Iraq selected by Ai Weiwei, that was published to coincide with the Iraq Pavilion at the 56th Venice Biennale.

1000 Years of Joys and Sorrows 

Released in November 2021, 1000 Years of Joys and Sorrows is a memoir that documents the life of Ai Weiwei with a focus on his father, the renowned Chinese poet, Ai Qing. The book begins by documenting AI Weiwei's relationship with his father and the parallels between their lives and struggles before describing Ai's success as an artist and his constant struggle with the Chinese authorities over censorship and personal freedoms.

Music
On 24 October 2012, Ai went live with a cover of Gangnam Style, the famous K-pop phenomenon by South Korean rapper PSY, through the posting of a four-minute long parody video on YouTube. The video was an attempt to criticize the Chinese government's attempt to silence his activism and was quickly blocked by national authorities.

On 22 May 2013, Ai debuted his first single Dumbass over the internet, with a music video shot by cinematographer Christopher Doyle. The video was a reconstruction of Ai's experience in prison, during his 81-day detention, and dives in and out of the prison's reality and the guarding soldiers' fantasies. He later released a second single, Laoma Tihua, on 20 June 2013 along with a video on his experience of state surveillance, with footage compiled from his studio's documentaries. On 22 June 2013, the two-year anniversary of Ai's release, he released his first music album The Divine Comedy. Later in August, he released a third music video for the song Chaoyang Park, also included in the album.

Other engagements
Ai is the artistic director of China Art Archives & Warehouse (CAAW), which he co-founded in 1997. This contemporary art archive and experimental gallery in Beijing concentrates on experimental art from the People's Republic of China, initiates and facilitates exhibitions and other forms of introductions inside and outside China. The building which houses it was designed by Ai in 2000.

On 15 March 2010, Ai took part in Digital Activism in China, a discussion hosted by The Paley Media Center in New York with Jack Dorsey (founder of Twitter) and Richard MacManus. Also in 2010 he served as jury member for Future Generation Art Prize, Kiev, Ukraine; contributed design for Comme de Garcons Aoyama Store, Tokyo, Japan; and participated in a talk with Nobel Prize winner Herta Müller at the International Culture festival  in Cologne, Germany.

In 2011, Ai sat on the jury of an international initiative to find a universal Logo for Human Rights. The winning design, combining the silhouette of a hand with that of a bird, was chosen from more than 15,300 suggestions from over 190 countries. The initiative's goal was to create an internationally recognized logo to support the global human rights movement.[98] In 2013, after the existence of the PRISM surveillance program was revealed, Ai said "Even though we know governments do all kinds of things I was shocked by the information about the US surveillance operation, Prism. To me, it's abusively using government powers to interfere in individuals' privacy. This is an important moment for international society to reconsider and protect individual rights."[99]

In 2012, Ai interviewed a member of the 50 Cent Party, a group of "online commentators" (otherwise known as sockpuppets) covertly hired by the Chinese government to post "comments favourable towards party policies and [intending] to shape public opinion on internet message boards and forums". Keeping Ai's source anonymous, the transcript was published by the British magazine New Statesman on 17 October 2012, offering insights on the education, life, methods and tactics used by professional trolls serving pro-government interests.

Ai designed the cover for 17 June 2013 issue of Time magazine. The cover story, by Hannah Beech, is "How China Sees the World". Time magazine called it "the most beautiful cover we've ever done in our history."

In 2011, Ai served as co-director and curator of the 2011 Gwangju Design Biennale, and co-curator of the exhibition Shanshui at The Museum of Art Lucerne. Also in 2011, Ai spoke at TED (conference) and was a guest lecturer at Oslo School of Architecture and Design.

In 2013, Ai became a Reporters Without Borders ambassador. He also gave a hundred pictures to the NGO in order to release a Photo book and a digital album, both sold in order to fund freedom of information projects.

In 2014–2015, Ai explored human rights and freedom of expression through an exhibition of his art exclusively created for Alcatraz, a notorious federal penitentiary in San Francisco Bay. Ai's @Large exhibit raised questions and contradictions about human rights and the freedom of expression through his artwork at the island's layered legacy as a 19th-century military fortress.
In February 2016, Ai WeiWei attached 14,000 bright orange life jackets to the columns of the Konzerthaus in Berlin. The life jackets had been discarded by refugees arriving on the shore on the Greek island of Lesbos. Later that year, he installed a different piece, also using discarded life jackets, at the pond at the Belvedere Palace in Vienna.

In 2017, Wolfgang Tillmans, Anish Kapoor and Ai Weiwei are among the six artists that have designed covers for ES Magazine celebrating the "resilience of London" in the wake of the Grenfell Tower fire and recent terror attacks.

In September 2019, the newly expanded and renovated Mildred Lane Kemper Art Museum at Washington University in St. Louis opened with a major exhibition of work by Ai Weiwei: "Bare Life".

A film by Ai Weiwei, CIRCA 20:20, was screened on global network of billboard screens in London, Tokyo and Seoul in October 2020.

From March 16 until September 4, 2022, a retrospective on Ai Weiwei's work is on display at the Albertina in Vienna, Austria under the title "Ai Weiwei. In Search of Humanity".

Awards and honors
2008
 Chinese Contemporary Art Awards, Lifetime Achievement

2009
 GQ Men of the Year 2009, Moral Courage (Germany); the ArtReview Power 100, rank 43; International Architecture Awards, Anthenaeum Museum of Architecture and Design, Chicago, US

2010
 In March 2010, Ai received an honorary doctorate degree from the Faculty of Politics and Social Science, University of Ghent, Belgium.
 In September 2010, Ai received Das Glas der Vernunft (The Prism of Reason), Kassel Citizen Award, Kassel, Germany.
 Ai was ranked 13th in ArtReviews guide to the 100 most powerful figures in contemporary art: Power 100, 2010. In 2010, he was also awarded a Wallpaper Design Award for the Tsai Residence, which won Best New Private House.
 Asteroid 83598 Aiweiwei, discovered by Bill Yeung in 2001, was named in his honor. The official  was published by the Minor Planet Center on 28 November 2010.

2011
 On 20 April 2011, Ai was appointed visiting professor of the Berlin University of the Arts.
 In October 2011, when ArtReview magazine named Ai number one in their annual Power 100 list, the decision was criticized by the Chinese authorities. Chinese Foreign Ministry spokesman Liu Weimin responded, "China has many artists who have sufficient ability. We feel that a selection that is based purely on a political bias and perspective has violated the objectives of the magazine".
 In December 2011, Ai was one of four runners-up in Times Person of the Year award. Other awards included: Wall Street Journal Innovators Award (Art); Foreign Policy Top Global Thinkers of 2011, rank 18; the Bianca Jagger Human Rights Foundation Award for Courage; ArtReview Power 100, rank 1; membership at the Academy of Arts, Berlin, Germany; the 2011 Time 100; the Wallpaper* 150; honorary academician at the Royal Academy of Arts, London, UK; and Skowhegan Medal for Multidisciplinary Art, New York City, US.

2012
 Along with Saudi Arabian women's rights activist Manal al-Sharif and Burmese dissident Aung San Suu Kyi, Ai received the inaugural Václav Havel Prize for Creative Dissent of the Human Rights Foundation on 2 May 2012. Ai was also awarded an honorary degree from Pratt Institute, honorary fellowship from Royal Institute of British Architects, elected as foreign member of Royal Swedish Academy of Arts, and recipient of the International Center of Photography Cornell Capa Award. Ai was ranked 3rd in ArtReviews Power 100. He was one of 12 visionaries honoured by Condé Nast Traveler, along with Hillary Clinton, Kofi Annan, and Nelson Mandela.

2013 
 In April, Ai received the Appraisers Association Award for Excellence in the Arts. Fast Company has listed him among its 2013 list of 100 Most Creative People in Business. His guest-edit in the 18 October issue of New Statesman has won an Amnesty Media Award in June 2013. He has received the St. Moritz Art Masters Lifetime Achievement Award by Cartier in August. His documentary Ping'an Yueqing (2012) has won the Spirit of Independence award at the Beijing Independent Film Festival. He was ranked no.9 in ArtReview Power 100. He received an honorary doctorate in fine arts at the Maryland Institute College of Art in Baltimore, US.

2015
 On 21 May 2015, Ai, along with the folk singer Joan Baez, received Amnesty International's Ambassador of Conscience Award, in Berlin, for showing exceptional leadership in the fight for human rights, through his life and work. The artist, who was at the time under surveillance and forbidden from leaving China, could not take part in the ceremony. His son Ai Lao accepted the prize on behalf of his father, called on the stage by Tate Modern director, Chris Dercon, who also spoke on behalf of the Chinese activist. Chris Dercon, who received the award on behalf of Ai Weiwei, said that Ai Weiwei wanted to pay tribute to those people in worse conditions than him, including civil rights lawyer Pu Zhiqiang who faces eight years in prison, imprisoned Nobel Peace Prize-winning poet Liu Xiaobo, journalist Gao Yu, women's rights activist Su Changlan, activist Liu Ping and academic Ilham Tohti.

2018
 In 2018, Ai Weiwei received Marina Kellen French Outstanding Contributions to the Arts Award granted by the Americans for the Arts.

See also

 WeiweiCam

Notes

References

Further reading
Medium,  Artists on the Cutting Edge, by Addison Fach, 1 December 2017
 WideWalls magazine, Excessivism – A Phenomenon Every Art Collector Should Know, by Angie Kordic
 Gallereo magazine, The Newest Art Movement You've Never Heard of, 20 November 2015
 The Huffington Post, Excessivism: Irony, *Imbalance and a New Rococo, by Shana Nys Dambrot, art critic, curator, 23 September 2015
 
 
 
 
 
 Spalding, David. @large: Ai Weiwei on Alcatraz, 2014. Print. @Large: Ai Weiwei on Alcatraz
 
 
 Ai, Weiwei; Anthony Pins. Ai Weiwei: Spatial Matters : Art Architecture and Activism, 2014. Print. Ai Weiwei: spatial matters : art architecture and activism

External links 

 
 Ai Weiwei exhibition at the Royal Academy of Arts London
 
 Ai Weiwei at De Pont Museum of Contemporary Art
 Ai Weiwei. Study of Perspective. Photographic series produced 1995–2011. Public Delivery

 
1957 births
Art Students League of New York alumni
Living people
Chinese contemporary artists
Chinese performance artists
Chinese architects
Chinese documentary film directors
Chinese bloggers
Chinese art critics
Chinese curators
People's Republic of China writers
Writers from Beijing
Beijing Film Academy alumni
Parsons School of Design alumni
Chinese dissidents
Artists from Beijing
Film directors from Beijing
Prisoners and detainees of the People's Republic of China
Weiquan movement
Victims of human rights abuses
Political artists
Articles containing video clips
Honorary Members of the Royal Academy
Sports venue architects
Chinese art collectors
People from the East Village, Manhattan
Chinese emigrants to Germany
Chinese emigrants to England
Enforced disappearances in China
Members of the Royal Swedish Academy of Arts